Astele scitula is a species of sea snail, a marine gastropod mollusk in the family Calliostomatidae.

Notes
Additional information regarding this species:
 Taxonomic remark: Some authors place this taxon in the subgenus Astele (Astelena)

Description
The height of the shell attains 15 mm. This is a very distinct little shell, with slender spire, granulose upper whorls, and a wide, rather depressed body whorl.

The small, thin shell is umbilicate. It has a slender elevated spire and a broad body whorl. Its color is yellowish, obscurely maculate with brown.  The seven whorls are convex. The apical whorls is smooth, following 3 or 4 granulate whorls. The rest is densely spirally striate, with light incremental lines which decussate the lirulae, especially beneath. The spire is slender, its lateral outlines concave. The body whorl is rounded at its periphery or obtusely angled, and convex beneath. The aperture is rounded. The outer and basal lips are thin, forming a half-circle. The white columella is  deeply arcuate, ending in an inconspicuous tubercle at base. The deep umbilicus is funnel-shaped and bounded by an angle.

Distribution
This marine species occurs from southern Queensland to South Australia.

References

External links
 To Encyclopedia of Life
 To USNM Invertebrate Zoology Mollusca Collection
 To World Register of Marine Species
 
 Seashells of New South Wales: Astele scitulum

scitula
Gastropods described in 1854